Simon Tobias Viktor Klose (born 3 September 1975 in Lund, Sweden) is a Swedish documentary and music video maker. His latest work is a documentary about The Pirate Bay called TPB AFK.

References

External links
 — official website

Simon Klose at The Pirate Bay

1975 births
Swedish film directors
People from Lund
Living people